Uladendron is a genus of flowering plants belonging to the family Malvaceae.

Its native range is Venezuela.

Species:
 Uladendron codesuri Marc.-Berti

References

Malvaceae
Malvaceae genera